Margaret "Meg" Snyder (previously Reyes, Stricklyn, Montgomery, and Ryan) is a character on the CBS Daytime soap opera As the World Turns. Meg is known as the grown daughter in the Snyder family, a central family in the fictional town of Oakdale. She was portrayed by Port Charles actress Marie Wilson from 2005 to 2010.

Casting 
Actress Jennifer Ashe was cast in the role of Meg Snyder, portraying Snyder from January 1986 until November 1989, when Ashe left the show. Ashe went on to reprise the role in June 1991, December 1992, and January 1993. Ashe returned for one final guest run from June 14 to June 21, 1994.

In April 2005, it was announced that former Port Charles actress Marie Wilson was cast to bring the character of Meg back to the series after an eleven-year absence. Wilson debuted in the role on June 16, 2005.

In April 2010, following the cancellation of the series, it was announced that Wilson would exit the series prior to its September 2010 finale. Wilson's last portrayal of Meg Snyder aired on June 29, 2010. Following her departure, Wilson joined the online web series The Bay as Isabella Ahmed.

Storylines 
Meg Snyder is the daughter of Emma and Harvey Snyder. She is the sister of Seth Snyder, Iva Snyder Benedict, Caleb Snyder, Elinor "Ellie" Snyder and Holden Snyder. She was involved with Dusty Donovan in the early years and even faked a pregnancy to trap him. Meg married Tonio Reyes, but had an affair with Josh Stricklyn and became pregnant. She had a miscarriage after falling down a flight of stairs. She later married Josh, and they left town.

She returned to Oakdale in 2005 after eleven years and began working as a nurse at Memorial Hospital.  It was revealed that she and Josh have since gotten a divorce, and picked up her old relationship with Dusty, until it was clear to her that he was in love with Jennifer Munson. Meg had planned to leave Oakdale, but instead found Paul Ryan in the woods, badly injured from a gunshot wound. Since he was a fugitive, she took him secretly to an abandoned cabin, treated his wounds as a nurse, and took care of him until he was healed. The two fell in love and later became engaged.

Craig Montgomery was released from jail for his role in switching the babies of Jennifer and Gwen Norbeck Munson, and set his eyes on Meg. She eventually left Paul at the altar, and slept with Craig after losing her job as a nurse after causing a patient's death due to negligence. She married Craig to regain control of Worldwide Industries, and restore the company to its original owner, Lucinda Walsh. Paul and Meg planned to leave Oakdale as soon as Lucinda had the company, but Craig found out and took Meg on a honeymoon. Craig then drugged Meg and let Paul come to a cliff. Paul falls from the cliff during a fight with Craig. When Paul is assumed dead, Meg continues through with her marriage with Craig, moving on. When Paul appears alive and returns with Craig's ex-wife Rosanna Cabot, the two agree to continue on with their separate lives. Meg then discovers she is pregnant, but having slept with both Craig and Paul, is unsure of who the father could be. While Paul and Craig were fighting, Meg attempted to break up the fight. Paul, as a result, pushes Meg accidentally, causing her to miscarry. Meg later divorced Craig, as Rosanna fell back into her comatose state. In the divorce decree, she returned Worldwide Industries to Lucinda.

In July 2008, Meg finally married Paul, nonetheless in a hospital bed, after being admitted for psychotic episodes, brought on by fatigue. After marrying, Meg discovered she was once again pregnant, with Paul's child once again. After finding out that Paul hired a Jennifer look-alike to seduce and distract Dusty, Meg asks for a divorce. A ghostly James Stenbeck convinces Paul to fake an overdose to get her back. Meg, having found a suicide note, went to the cabin they shared when she nursed him back to health and found Paul having overdosed in the chair. After trying to resuscitate him and get him to the car, she goes into labor. She calls Dusty and he takes her to the hospital, where she delivers healthy baby, whom she names Eliza. Paul subsequently agreed to Meg's divorce. Dusty then learned that Craig had plans to marry Carly Tenney Snyder in an attempt to take Johnny away from him by proving he had more of a stable family. So to retaliate, Dusty proposed to Meg, a proposal she accepted to help Dusty. The marriage is soon considered invalid.

Meg is committed to Deerbrook Mental Hospital, due to an account by Damian Grimaldi, who made the rejected Meg believe he was leaving Lily for her. Damian later paid a man to turn off the cameras at Deerbrook and told Meg he loved her and was leaving Lily, and paid a doctor to tamper with Meg's medications to keep her unstable.

Upon escaping from Deerbrook, with the help of Paul and his wife, Emily Stewart, Meg goes to find Damian to kill him for keeping her committed. During their struggle, Damian strangles Meg and she falls to the floor. Lily comes back, meanwhile, to argue leaving again with Damian. Months later, following Eliza's christening, Paul agrees to let Meg move back into Fairwinds despite Emily's objections. Meg's delusions continued as she drugged herself with methadone, in order to gain Paul's attention. When left alone, Meg shoots Emily with a gun filled with blanks. She is then admitted into Memorial under psychiatric care. Paul gently encourages her to receive the treatment that she needs. Though he assures her that a part of him will always love her, he cannot follow her on her journey to recovery, but she must push herself to get better for Eliza's sake. Coming to terms with her drug-induced illness and the toxicity of her relationship with Paul, Meg agrees to go with Emma to a treatment facility in Washington, D.C. Meg leaves Memorial with confidence with her mother and brother Holden by her side.

References

External links
 As The World Turns: Meg Snyder character
 Meg Snyder at  soapcentral.com
  As the World Turns CAST - Meg Snyder at soaps.com

As the World Turns characters
Fictional nurses
Television characters introduced in 1986
Fictional business executives
Female characters in television